The 1986 Texas A&M Aggies football team represented Texas A&M University in the 1986 NCAA Division I-A football season as a member of the Southwest Conference (SWC).

Schedule

Roster

Rankings

Game summaries

at LSU

North Texas State

Southern Miss

Texas Tech

at Houston

Baylor

Rice

at SMU

at Arkansas

TCU

at Texas

vs. Ohio State (Cotton Bowl)

1987 NFL Draft

References

Texas AandM
Texas A&M Aggies football seasons
Southwest Conference football champion seasons
Texas AandM Aggies football